Shuyushka is a genus of spiders in the family Anyphaenidae. It was first described in 2016 by Nadine Dupérré and Elicio Tapia. , it contains 3 species from Ecuador.

References

Anyphaenidae
Araneomorphae genera
Spiders of South America